A Fauconneau was a small type of cannon used during the Middle Ages and the early Renaissance. A typical fauconneau weighed about 25 kg and had a length of about 1 meter. It was a semi-portable weapon. It was mainly an anti-personnel weapon to be used on fixed fortifications. and was used from the 15th to 16th centuries.

Gallery

Notes

Medieval artillery